Lobopterella dimidiatipes is a species from the genus Lobopterella.  It can be found in Japan.

References

Cockroaches
Insects described in 1890
Insects of Japan